Arthur Herbert Greenwood (January 31, 1880 – April 26, 1963) was a United States Representative (D) for Indiana for 2nd District from 1923–1933 and for the 7th District 1933–1939. Greenwood was defeated in 1938.

The Baptist lawyer, farmer and banker graduated from the Indiana University Bloomington in 1905, as well as The George Washington University. He served in the member of the board of education for Washington, Indiana 1910–1916. As a lawyer, Greenwood was county attorney of Daviess County 1911–1915, then as prosecuting attorney for the forty-ninth judicial circuit 1916–1918.

He served in the United States Congress from 1923 to 1939 and was House Majority Whip in the seventy-third Congress.

He served as a member of a number of commissions including:

 George Rogers Clark Memorial Commission

He lived in Bradenton, Florida and died in 1963 in Bethesda, Montgomery County, Maryland and was buried in Washington, Indiana.

External links
 
Bioguide
Political Graveyard — Arthur Greenwood
Congression Bio

 

1880 births
1963 deaths
Indiana University Maurer School of Law alumni
George Washington University alumni
Democratic Party members of the United States House of Representatives from Indiana
20th-century American politicians